Donnchad Ua Briain was Bishop of Limerick in the late 12th and early 13th centuries.

A relative of the Limerick Royal Family, he died in 1207.

References 

Date of birth unknown
1207 deaths
12th-century Roman Catholic bishops in Ireland
13th-century Roman Catholic bishops in Ireland
Roman Catholic bishops of Limerick